Khalil Suleiman (1943/1944–4 March 2002) was a Palestinian doctor in Jenin in the West Bank.  He was head of the Palestinian Red Crescent Society Emergency Medical Service (effectively the ambulance service) in Jenin.

He was killed and two other medical personnel seriously injured when an ambulance was hit by a rifle-mounted grenade fired by the Israeli Defence Forces.

The International Red Cross and the European Union have both complained about this attack.

The hospital in Jenin is now named after him, the Martyr Doctor Khalil Suleiman Hospital. His brothers son was named Khalil after his uncle.

External links
article on his death
report from Amnesty International
another report
eyewitness account of killing

References

1940s births
2002 deaths
20th-century Palestinian physicians
Palestinian emergency physicians